Robert Charles Craig (March 9, 1921 – March 25, 1990) was a professor in the department of Counseling, Educational Psychology, and Special Education at Michigan State University from 1966–1989.

Craig also worked at Washington State University, American Institute of Research, Marquee University, and the University of Pittsburgh.

Craig published three books: The Psychology of Learning in the Classroom, Contemporary Educational Psychology, and Contemporary Issues in Educational Psychology.

References

1921 births
1990 deaths
Michigan State University faculty
20th-century American psychologists
Washington State University faculty
University of Pittsburgh faculty